This is a list of programs produced and/or acquired by DIC Entertainment. As of 2023, most of the DIC library is currently owned by WildBrain through its in-name-only unit, Cookie Jar Group.

International rights to DIC's pre-1990 library was owned by C&D Entertainment until 1996, until Saban acquired their assets and so international distribution moved to Saban International/BVS International. This remained until 2001 when Disney bought the Fox Family Worldwide franchise of libraries and assets, as well as the 75.7% majority stake in Fox Kids Europe (later renamed to Jetix Europe), making international distribution rights to its pre-1990 library moved to Disney. In March 2006, DIC Entertainment re-acquired the international rights to 20 shows of its pre-1990 library from Disney.

The international distribution rights to the post-1990 library are initially started off being distributed by Italian studio Silvio Berlusconi Communications, and later ABC Distribution Company and Buena Vista International Television, before DIC became re-independent in 2000 and started self-distributing internationally.

Many of DIC's shows that were not re-acquired back by DIC Entertainment, including most shows produced by DIC's French division which are part of the Créativité et Développement library, are currently owned by The Walt Disney Company through BVS Entertainment.

Animated shows 
DIC Audiovisuel

 DIC Enterprises / DIC Entertainment / DIC Animation City

Live-action shows

TV specials 
 Poochie (1984)
 Robotman & Friends (1985) (co-production with United Media Productions and LBS Communications)
 The Kingdom Chums: Little David's Adventure (1986) (co-production with Diana Kerew Productions)
 Barbie and the Rockers: Out of This World (September 1987) (co-production with Mattel)
 Barbie and the Sensations: Rockin' Back to Earth (September 1987) (co-production with Mattel)
 Meet Julie (1987)
 Madeline (1988)
 Madeline's Christmas (1990)
 Madeline and the Bad Hat (1991)
 Madeline and the Gypsies (1991)
 Madeline's Rescue (1991)
 Madeline in London (1991)
 Little Golden Book Land (1989) (co-production with Western Publishing)
 Battletoads (1992)
 Defenders of Dynatron City (1992)
 Hulk Hogan: All-Time Champ (1992)
 Super Trolls (1992) (co-produced with Bohbot Entertainment)
 Inspector Gadget Saves Christmas (1992) (co-production with LBS Communications)
 A Hollywood Hounds Christmas (1994)
 Legend of the Hawaiian Slammers (1994)
 Jingle Bell Rock (1995)
 Twas the Night Before Bumpy (1995) 
 Sonic Christmas Blast (1996) (co-production with Sega of America)

Theatrical films 
Produced in France
 Here Come the Littles (1985) (co-production with ABC Motion Pictures and Clubhouse Pictures)
 Rainbow Brite and the Star Stealer (1985) (co-production with Warner Bros. Pictures)
 Heathcliff: The Movie (1986) (co-production with LBS Communications and Clubhouse Pictures)

Produced in America:
 Meet the Deedles (1998; live-action) (co-production with Walt Disney Pictures and Peak Productions)
 Inspector Gadget (1999; live-action) (co-production with Walt Disney Pictures, Caravan Pictures and The Kerner Entertainment Company)
 Strawberry Shortcake: The Sweet Dreams Movie (2006; computer animation) (co-produced by American Greetings and 20th Century Fox)

TV movies 
 Liberty and the Littles (1986) (co-production with ABC; later aired as multi-part TV episode)
 Liberty (1986: live-action) (co-production with NBC and Robert Greenwald Productions)
  The Kingdom Chums: Little David's Adventure (1986) (co-production with ABC and Diana Kerew Productions)
 Barbie and the Rockers: Out of This World (1987) (co-produced with Saban Productions)
 Barbie and the Sensations: Rockin' Back to Earth (1987) (co-produced with Saban Productions)
 Dennis the Menace: Dinosaur Hunter (1987; live-action) (co-production with Coca-Cola Telecommunications)
 Archie: To Riverdale and Back Again (1990)
 Mori no Tonto-tachi (1990) (combined episodes to make a movie called A Christmas Adventure; co-distributed with Saban Entertainment)
 The Magic Flute (1994) (acquired from ABC Entertainment; produced by Ruby-Spears Productions, Greengrass Productions, and ABC Entertainment)
 The Secret Garden (1994) (acquired from ABC Entertainment; produced by Mike Young Productions, Greengrass Productions, and ABC Entertainment)
 Genius (1999; live-action)
 DIC Movie Toons (2002)
 Sabrina: Friends Forever
 Inspector Gadget's Last Case (co-production with BVS Entertainment)
 Time Kid
 Dennis the Menace: Cruise Control
 The Archies in Jugman
 Dinosaur Island
 My Fair Madeline
 Groove Squad
 Treasure Island
 Globehunters: An Around the World in 80 Days Adventure (produced by Nickelodeon Animation Studio and Frederator Studios)
 The Amazing Zorro
 20,000 Leagues Under The Sea

Direct-to-video features and movies 
 A Christmas Carol (1997)
 The Adventures of Snowden (1997)
 Our Friend, Martin (1999) (co-production with Intellectual Properties Worldwide)
 Madeline: Lost in Paris (1999)
 Monster Mash (2000, co-production with RAI Radiotelevisione Italiana)
 My Fair Madeline (2002)
 Inspector Gadget's Biggest Caper Ever! (2005) (CGI)
 Madeline in Tahiti (2005) 
 McKids Adventures (co-production with McDonald's, KanDoKid Films and Brookwell McNamara Entertainment):
 Get Up and Go with Ronald (2006) (live-action) 
 Treasure Hunt with Ronald (2006) (live-action) 
 Iz and the Zizzles (2006)
 Iz and the Zizzles: Will the Zizzles Sizzle or Fizzle? (2006)

Direct-to-video compilations 

Notes:

References 

Lists of animated films